Step by Step Up to Union With God is a book by Abdolhossein Zarrinkoob, a scholar of Iranian literature, history of literature, Persian culture and history.

The book is about the life, thought and spiritual conduct of the 13th-century Persian Sufi poet, Mowlana Jalaluddin Mohammad Balkhi Rumi (1207–1273). The author, Abdolhossein Zarrinkoob, unlike his other writings, refrained from giving various references and sources in the book and has written all the contents in a simple, fluent and common sense.

The title of the book is taken from a distich from the section called "Books 3" from "Masnavi" written by "Rumi":

Plot
The book Step by Step Up to Union With God: Life, Thought and Spiritual Journey of Jalal-al-din Rumi tells the story of the "Rumi 's" life from his birth to the end of his life.
It starts from "Rumi 's" childhood, and gradually reviews his whole life, mystical conduct and spiritual ascension. The book is mostly written as a story; But it is a documentary story whose subject matter is not one of the conventional categories of the story. The book covers the poet's childhood and his travels with his father from Khorasan and Baghdad to Anatolia, where he remained in Konya for the rest of his life. Everywhere in the book, there is talk of "Rumi 's" love for God and his efforts to reach the god and the beloved, and only a few parts of the book deal with his daily activities, mostly including mystical aspects of "Rumi 's" life. The author has tried to present a simple book to readers without cumbersome contents.

The text of the book depicts the revelations of "Rumi 's" childhood years, his asceticism and austerity, the illusions of his school years and then the interruption of them in the sequence of years, the levels of a spiritual conduct that is the result of his life and the basis of his book "Masnavi".

The book appraises "Rumi 's" spiritual excitement, his love for the perfect man, his ecstasy and his obsession with poetry, dance and music, which separates him step by step from his belongings and prepares him to ascend to meet the Lord. The author pursues events separately and in the sequence of normal life, without going into the details of the secrets of "Rumi 's" teaching, draws a picture of his condition and thoughts to the extent that shows traces of "Rumi 's" long secrets throughout the "Masnavi", and sequels the sixty-eight-year life of Rumi and its unique attributes such as the spiritual, uninterrupted and indefatigable journey step by step from cutting off the heart's desire from the world to disappearing self-existence and unity with the whole wisdom.

Thus, the book shows the path of "Rumi 's" conduct which starts from the discard dependencies with one's own belongings and continues until the severance of ties with one's ego, and this path is the base of the elegance theme of "Masnavi" and a summary of the "Rumi 's" life too.

Book chapters
The book "Step by Step Up to Union With God: Life, Thought and Spiritual Journey of Jalal-al-din Rumi" has about 400 pages and 100 sections. The chapters are:

 "",  "Baha ol-Valad and the Lord"
 "",  "Emigration or escape"
 "",  "The aged mentor in Konya"
 "",  "Advent of Shams"
 "",  "Irreversible absence"
 "",  "Dance in the bazaar"
 "",  "Hesamuddin and the story of Masnavi"
 "",  "Crossing beyond poetry"
 "",  "From the stations of asceticism to the passing away (from self-existence)"
 "",  "The last years"
 "",  "Notes and bibliography"

An excerpt text
The following text excerpted from Chapter 9 "From the stations of asceticism to the passing away (from self-existence)":

Translation
The book "Step by Step Up to Union With God: Life, Thought and Spiritual Journey of Jalal-al-din Rumi" has been translated into English and published in the United States in 2009. It has been translated into Turkish and published in Istanbul, and has been translated into Kurdish and published in Erzurum, Turkey.

See also
 Two Centuries of Silence
 The Hundred Tales of Wisdom
 Understanding Islamic Sciences
 Spiritual Discourses

References

External links
 Step by Step Up to Union with God: Life, Thought and Spiritual Journey of ... - ʻAbd al-Ḥusayn Zarrīnʹkūb - Google Books
 A.-H. Zarrinkub, Step by Step up to Union with God: The Life, Thought and Spiritual Journey of Jalal-al-Din Rumi
 Pelle pelle ta molaghate khoda - goodreads
 Step by step up to union with God: life, thought and spiritual journey of Jalal-al-Din Rumi (Book, 2009) [WorldCat.org]
 Step by step up to union with God: life, thought and spiritual journey of Jalal-al-Din Rumi in SearchWorks catalog
 ADAB FOR A PEACEFUL WORLD: A Study of Jalaluddin Rumi’s Concept of Sufism

Abdolhossein Zarrinkoob
Works by Abdolhossein Zarrinkoob
Iranian books
Rumi